Kenting National Park, commonly known as Kenting, is a national park located on the Hengchun Peninsula of Pingtung County, Taiwan, covering Hengchun, Checheng, and Manzhou Townships. Established on 1 January 1984, it is Taiwan's oldest and the southernmost national park on the main island, covering the southernmost area of the Taiwan island along Bashi Channel. Administered by the Executive Yuan's Ministry of the Interior, this national park is well known for its tropical climate and sunshine, scenic mountain and beach, the Spring Scream rock-band festival held in every March, and has long been one of the most popular tourist destinations in Taiwan with 5.84 million visitors in 2016.

Etymology
Kenting (墾丁, Kun-ting in Taiwanese) means pathfinders or pioneers.

Geography
Nan Wan and Banana Bay (香蕉灣) is surrounded by the Pacific Ocean, the Taiwan Strait, and the Luzon Strait.

The landscape boasted by Kenting National Park is divided into two parts by the long and narrow Hengchun Longitudinal Valley Plain that extends from north to south. With coral sea cliffs teemed with fringing reefs along the west coast, the park features a large number of mountains in the north, and coral tablelands and foothills in the south. The plain, which is formed by fault valleys, has a vast lake called Longluan Lake, together with rising coral tablelands and limestone caves to the east. The east side of the coral tablelands features unique sand rivers and sand waterfalls formed by the combined effects of winds and rivers, as well as coral cliffs, sunken caves and stalactites.

Climate
Kenting is known for its tropical climate with warm to hot weather year-round. Along with the rest of Pingtung, the climate is geographically classified as a tropical monsoon climate.

Biodiversity

The park hosts rich terrestrial biodiversity of fauna and flora including 15 species of mammals, 310 species of birds, 59 species of reptiles and amphibians, 21 species of freshwater fish, 216 species of butterflies, and various insects.

Eluanbi Park or Oluanpi Park (鹅鑾鼻公園) is located at Cape Eluanbi. Nature reserves such as the Longkeng Ecological Protection Area (龍坑生態保護區) protecting coral reefs and virgin forest of Banana Bay and Hengchun Peninsula. 26 species of land crabs inhabit in the area and which is the highest diversity of terrestrial crabs in single areas in the world. 34 species of terrestrial mammals including 5 locally extinct such as Formosan clouded leopard, and 4 introduced such as water buffalo, have been recorded. Formosan sika deer which became extinct in wild in 1969, was first reintroduced into Kenting National Park in 1994. Aside from sika deer, 6 species of terrestrial mammals were once thought to be extinct in the area, while critically endangered Chinese pangolin were rediscovered a decade after.

Ocean current which flows off the park provides rich diversities of marine ecosystems including sea birds, sea turtles including critically endangered hawksbill turtles, sharks such as bull sharksmanta-rays, and whale sharks, and smaller to medium-sized cetaceans. The area was once a major wintering ground for sperm and baleen whales especially humpback whales that migrated into Nan Wan and Banana Bay. Japanese whaling during Japanese colonial days, led to severe depletions or disappearances of whales in consequence. Today, no or very few whales may constantly migrate along Hengchun Peninsula and into the park's waters. Dugongs, thought to be either fully or functionally extinct in Taiwan, were reported in the 1950s and 60s, and these were some of the last report of the species in Taiwanese waters.

The national park is an important stopover on the migration path of the gray-faced buzzard.

Lighthouse 

Eluanbi Lighthouse was completed in 1883, following requests from the American and Japanese governments to the Chinese government after several shipwrecks occurred in the 1860s (including the Rover incident). Chinese troops had to be sent to protect the lighthouse during construction from attacks by local tribesmen, and the lighthouse was surrounded by a fort with cannons and a ditch for protection. It is one of the rare examples in the world of a fortified lighthouse.

Transportation 
Bus: Frequent buses link this park with Kaohsiung International Airport, Taiwan Railway Administration's Kaohsiung Station and the Taiwan High Speed Rail Zuoying Station, a journey of 2.5 hours.
Air: This park is served by the domestic Hengchun Airport although flights are rare and are subject to cancellation due to the strong Katabatic wind which is frequent in the Hengchun Peninsula.

In popular culture 
Spring Scream: A well-known international rock-band festival held inside this park since 1995.
Most parts of the 2008 film Cape No. 7 were filmed inside this park, and nearby Hengchun.
Part of the 2012 film Life of Pi was filmed inside the park, which is not far from its director Ang Lee's birth place.

Gallery

See also
Amorgos oil spill
List of national parks in Taiwan
Rover incident

References

External links

Official website 
UU Kenting 
Kenting National Park on Taiwan Mag 
 Kenting Weekend CondeNast Traveler Mag 
Coastal Observations: Erluanbi, Southern Taiwan in Shore & Beach, Vol. 75, No. 2, pp. 36–39 (ISSN 0037-4237)
Mount Dejian, Kenting, Pintung County, South Coast of Taiwan, Coastal Photograph by Hubert Chanson in Journal of Coastal Research, Vol. 25, No. 3, May, p. 672 (ISSN 0749-0208)

1984 establishments in Taiwan
National parks of Taiwan
Geography of Pingtung County
Protected areas established in 1984
Tourist attractions in Pingtung County